The Hamad Bin Khalifa Civilisation Center (HBKCC) is a sunni mosque in the Outer Nørrebro borough of Copenhagen, Denmark. Built in 2014, it is the first purposely-built mosque in Denmark and one of the largest in Europe.

History 
In September 2013, as the mosque was still under construction, critics rose about the plan to broadcast the official Hamas-run television channel Al-Aqsa TV in the media center of the mosque, Hamas being blacklisted as a terrorist organization in the European Union (of which Denmark is a member).

In June 2014, the Danish Islamic Council opened the Grand Mosque of Copenhagen (officially Hamad Bin Khalifa Civilisation Center, after the Emir of Qatar Hamad bin Khalifa Al Thani), the country's largest mosque, and the first one with a minaret. Qatar provided $27 million to finance the construction, which led the Danish People's Party to express their concerns about potential Qatari interference of in Danish domestic affairs. The Danish royal family and government ministers were invited to attend the opening but declined the invitation, with only Copenhagen's deputy mayor for social issues Jesper Christensen attending.

It was agreed with the municipality of Copenhagen that the minaret would not be used to broadcast a call to prayer.

The group Stop Islamisation of Denmark had planned to protest in front of the building the day of its opening, but was banned by the police.

In 2020, Berlingske newspaper reported that the mosque had received 227 million Danish crowns (more than 23 million euro) from investors in Qatar.

Description 
The mosque was designed by the Danish architects Jan Wenzel & Lars Tuxen and is the property of the Danish Islamic Council. It has the capacity to host 3,000 people indoors, and an extra 1,500 in an inner courtyard. The mosque's exterior is made of titanium, glass and polished concrete. Many architectural elements symbolize the link of the building with Mecca.

See also 
 Danish Islamic Council
 Islam in Denmark

References

External links

 Official website

2014 establishments in Denmark
Mosques completed in 2014
Mosques in Denmark
Religious buildings and structures in Copenhagen
Salafi movement
Copenhagen